Randolph County is a county located in the U.S. state of West Virginia. As of the 2020 census, the population was 27,932. Its county seat is Elkins. The county was founded in 1787 and is named for Edmund Jennings Randolph.

Randolph County comprises the Elkins, West Virginia, Micropolitan Statistical Area.

History
The first attempt by whites at settlement in present-day Randolph County came in 1752 or '53 when David Tygart — for whom the Tygart Valley River was named — and Robert Foyle (later called Files) located (separately) with their families in the vicinity of present-day Beverly. Although there had been no recent history of conflicts between whites and Indians in that immediate area, that summer a party of Indians traveling the Shawnee Trail discovered the Foyle cabin and killed seven members of the family. One son escaped and alerted the Tygart family, allowing all to escape. (The Tygart-Foyle settlements were the first white settlements attempted anywhere within the Monongahela River watershed in present-day West Virginia.) No other white settlement was attempted in present Randolph until 1772.

Thomas Skidmore (ca. 1733–1807), born in Maryland, obtained a title to 400 acres of land (“by virtue of a settlement”) in the future Elkins area before 1778. This land, on the east side of the Tygart Valley River, was surveyed by John Poage in 1780 and included the land that is now most of downtown Elkins. Thus, Skidmore was probably the first white settler in what became Elkins. 

When Randolph County, Virginia (now West Virginia) was created out of the vast Harrison County on October 16, 1787, it included not only present-day Randolph County, but parts of what are now eight other counties. It took its name from the surname of the then Governor of Virginia. The name of the new county seat, originally Randolph Court House, or Edmundton (the latter from the Governor's given name), was changed to Beverly by 1790. Beverly remained the county seat until 1890 when county government was moved to Elkins.

Minor actions of the American Civil War which took place in Randolph County include the Battle of Rich Mountain and a part of the Battle of Cheat Mountain, both in 1861. These operations came in the course of the Western Virginia Campaign.

Randolph was one of fifty Virginia counties that were admitted to the Union as the state of West Virginia on June 20, 1863.  Later that year, the new state's counties were divided into civil townships, with the intention of encouraging local government.  This proved impractical in the heavily rural state, and in 1872 the townships were converted into magisterial districts.  Randolph County was divided into nine districts: Beverly, Clarke, Clay, Dry Fork, Green, Mingo Flats, Reynolds, Scott, and Union.  Several of these were renamed during the 1870s: Clark became Valley Bend, Clay became New Interest, Green became Leadsville, Mingo Flats was abbreviated to Mingo, Reynolds became Huttonsville, Scott became Roaring Creek, and Union became Middle Fork.

Geography

It is the largest county in West Virginia by area.

Rivers
Tygart Valley River
Shavers Fork
Laurel Fork

Mountains
Point Mountain
Cheat Mountain
White Top, a knob of Cheat Mountain
Laurel Mountain
Rich Mountain
Shavers Mountain
Gaudineer Knob, a knob of Shavers Mountain

Caves and caverns
Bowden Cave
Sinks of Gandy

National Natural Landmarks
Blister Run Swamp
Gaudineer Scenic Area
Shavers Mountain Spruce-Hemlock Stand

Major highways

Adjacent counties
Tucker County (northeast)
Pendleton County (east)
Pocahontas County (south)
Webster County (southwest)
Upshur County (west)
Barbour County (northwest)

National protected area
Monongahela National Forest (part)
United States National Radio Quiet Zone (part)

Demographics

2020 census 
As of the 2020 census, there were 27,932 people and 10,065 households residing in the county. There were 13,035 housing units in Randolph county. The racial makeup of the county was 93.6% White, 1.6% African American, 0.4% Asian, 0.2% Native American, 0.5% from other races, and 3.8% from two or more races. Hispanics or Latinos of any race were 1.1% of the population.

There were 10,065 households, of which 44.8% were married couples living together, 30.2% had a female householder with no spouse present, 19% had a male householder with no spouse present.The average household and family size was 3.36. The median age in the county was 44.7 years with 19% of the population being under 18. The median income for a household in the city was $47,343 and the poverty rate was 15.2%

2010 census 
As of the 2010 United States census, there were 29,405 people, 11,695 households, and 7,753 families living in the county. The racial makeup of the county was 97.3% white, 1.2% black or African American, 0.3% Asian, 0.2% American Indian, 0.1% from other races, and 0.8% from two or more races. Those of Hispanic or Latino origin made up 0.7% of the population. In terms of ancestry, 26.3% were German, 15.9% were Irish, 12.0% were English, 10.2% were American, and 5.4% were Italian.

Of the 11,695 households, 27.1% had children under the age of 18 living with them, 51.0% were married couples living together, 10.5% had a female householder with no husband present, 33.7% were non-families, and 28.4% of all households were made up of individuals. The average household size was 2.32 and the average family size was 2.81. The median age was 43.4 years.

The median income for a household in the county was $36,176 and the median income for a family was $47,071. Males had a median income of $34,903 versus $25,988 for females. The per capita income for the county was $18,472. About 12.7% of families and 17.1% of the population were below the poverty line, including 26.1% of those under age 18 and 11.4% of those age 65 or over.

2000 census
As of the census of 2000, there were 28,262 people, 11,072 households, and 7,661 families living in the county.  The population density was 27 people per square mile (10/km2).  There were 13,478 housing units at an average density of 13 per square mile (5/km2).  The racial makeup of the county was 97.69% White, 1.07% Black or African American, 0.16% Native American, 0.38% Asian, 0.01% Pacific Islander, 0.16% from other races, and 0.53% from two or more races.  0.68% of the population were Hispanic or Latino of any race.

There were 11,072 households, out of which 29.80% had children under the age of 18 living with them, 54.70% were married couples living together, 9.80% had a female householder with no husband present, and 30.80% were non-families. 26.30% of all households were made up of individuals, and 11.90% had someone living alone who was 65 years of age or older.  The average household size was 2.41 and the average family size was 2.89.

In the county, the population was spread out, with 22.30% under the age of 18, 8.70% from 18 to 24, 28.50% from 25 to 44, 25.40% from 45 to 64, and 15.10% who were 65 years of age or older.  The median age was 39 years. For every 100 females there were 101.30 males.  For every 100 females age 18 and over, there were 99.70 males.

The median income for a household in the county was $27,299, and the median income for a family was $32,632. Males had a median income of $24,751 versus $17,819 for females. The per capita income for the county was $14,918.  About 13.40% of families and 18.00% of the population were below the poverty line, including 24.30% of those under age 18 and 12.90% of those age 65 or over.

Politics

Communities

City
Elkins (county seat)

Towns
Beverly
Harman
Huttonsville
Mill Creek
Montrose
Womelsdorf (Coalton)

Magisterial districts

Beverly
Dry Fork
Huttonsville
Leadsville
Middle Fork
Mingo
New Interest
Roaring Creek
Valley Bend

Census-designated places

Bowden
Dailey
East Dailey
Helvetia
Pickens
Valley Bend
Valley Head
Whitmer

Unincorporated communities

Adolph
Aggregates
Alpena
Arnold Hill
Bemis
Brady Gate
Bruxton
Canfield
Cassity
Crystal Springs
Czar
Dryfork
Elkins Junction
Elkwater
Ellamore
Evenwood
Faulkner
Glady
Horton
Jimtown
Kerens
Little Italy
Mabie
Mingo
Monterville
Newlonton
Norton
Osceola
Pumpkintown
Read
Spangler
Sullivan
Tigheville
Upper Mingo
Weaver
Whyte

Notable people
Herman Ball, football player
Lemuel Chenoweth, master covered bridge builder
William Wallace Barron, former governor who was indicted for bribery and jury tampering.
Dellos Clinton "Sheriff" Gainer, major league baseball player
Marshall Goldberg, football player
Wilma Lee Cooper Grand Ole Opry and WWVA Jamboree star
Stoney Cooper, Grand Ole  Opry and WWVA Jamboree star
Eldora Marie Bolyard Nuzum, American newspaper editor and interviewer of U.S. Presidents

See also
 Becky Creek Wildlife Management Area
 National Register of Historic Places listings in Randolph County, West Virginia

References

 
1787 establishments in Virginia
Populated places established in 1787
Counties of Appalachia